Mark Nickeas (born 20 October 1956) is an English retired football defender. He spent five seasons in the North American Soccer League, one in the Major Indoor Soccer League and two in the Western Soccer Alliance.

In 1975, Nickeas began his professional career with Chester. In 1980, he moved to the Vancouver Whitecaps of the North American Soccer League. The NASL collapsed following the 1984 season. On 1 November 1984, he signed as a free agent with the Dallas Sidekicks in the Major Indoor Soccer League. The team released him on 16 April 1985 In June 1985, he signed with the San Jose Earthquakes which played as an independent team that summer, but did compete in the Western Alliance Challenge Series. In 1986 and 1987, Nickeas and his teammates spent the season in the Western Soccer Alliance.

He lives in Westlake Village, California. His son is retired professional baseball player Mike Nickeas. He has two children, Michael Nickeas and Hailey Rae Nickeas.

References

External links

NASL/MISL stats

1956 births
Living people
Footballers from Southport
Dallas Sidekicks (original MISL) players
English footballers
English expatriate footballers
Major Indoor Soccer League (1978–1992) players
North American Soccer League (1968–1984) players
North American Soccer League (1968–1984) indoor players
San Jose Earthquakes (1974–1988) players
Vancouver Whitecaps (1974–1984) players
Western Soccer Alliance players
Chester City F.C. players
English Football League players
People from Westlake Village, California
Sportspeople from Ventura County, California
Association football defenders
English expatriate sportspeople in the United States
Expatriate soccer players in the United States
English expatriate sportspeople in Canada
Expatriate soccer players in Canada